This is a list of Social Democratic Party conventions. Social Democratic Party was founded in 1899 as the name of Labour Party of Finland until 1903. There has been 38 party conventions plus 7 extra conventions.

Puoluekokoukset 1899–2016

References

Political party assemblies
Political conventions
Social Democratic Party of Finland